Petrozavodsk Railway subdivision is a subdivision in the October Railway, Russia.
It includes most parts of Southern Karelia, with a total length of 1915 km.

Oktyabrskaya Railway